Challwa Q'asa (Quechua challwa fish, q'asa mountain pass, "fish pass", also spelled Chayhuajasa) is a mountain in the Wansu mountain range in the Andes of Peru, about  high. It is located in the Ayacucho Region, Parinacochas Province, Coronel Castañeda District.

References 

Mountains of Peru
Mountains of Ayacucho Region